A bird observatory is a centre for the study of bird migration and bird populations. They are usually focused on local birds, but may also include interest in far-flung areas. Most bird observatories are small operations with a limited staff, many volunteers and a not-for-profit educational status. Many bird observatories conduct bird ringing or bird banding (term in the United States).

Australia
Barren Grounds Bird Observatory, New South Wales
Broome Bird Observatory, Western Australia
Eyre Bird Observatory, Western Australia
Rotamah Island Bird Observatory, Victoria

Brazil 
 Mantiqueira Bird Observatory  (Observatório de Aves da Mantiqueira)

Britain and Ireland
The United Kingdom's first bird observatory was established in 1933 by Ronald Lockley in the Welsh island of Skokholm. This is a list of members of the Bird Observatories Council of Britain and Ireland.
Alderney Bird Observatory, Alderney
Bardsey Bird and Field Observatory, Bardsey Island
Calf of Man Bird Observatory, Calf of Man
Cape Clear Bird Observatory, Cape Clear
Copeland Bird Observatory, Copeland
Dungeness Bird Observatory, Dungeness
Fair Isle Bird Observatory, Fair Isle
Filey Bird Observatory, Filey
Flamborough Bird Observatory, Flamborough Head
Gibraltar Point Bird Observatory, Gibraltar Point
Hilbre Bird Observatory, Hilbre Islands
Holme Bird Observatory, Holme next the Sea
Isle of May Bird Observatory & Field Station, Isle of May
Landguard Bird Observatory, Landguard
North Ronaldsay Bird Observatory, North Ronaldsay
Portland Bird Observatory and Field Centre, Portland
SBBOT Field Centre, Sandwich Bay
Skokholm Bird Observatory, Skokholm
Spurn Bird Observatory, Spurn
Walney Bird Observatory, Walney Island

Canada
Observatories belonging to the Canadian Migration Monitoring Network:

 Holiday Beach Migration Observatory
 Rocky Point Bird Observatory
 Vaseux Lake Bird Observatory
 Mackenzie, British Columbia|Mackenzie Nature Observatory (www.MackenzieNatureObservatory.ca)
 Lesser Slave Lake Bird Observatory
 Beaverhill Bird Observatory
 Inglewood Bird Sanctuary
 Last Mountain Bird Observatory
 Delta Marsh Bird Observatory
 Thunder Cape Bird Observatory
 Whitefish Point Bird Observatory
 Long Point Bird Observatory
 Haldimand County, Ontario|Haldimand Bird Observatory
 Toronto Bird Observatory
 Prince Edward Point Bird Observatory
 Innis Point Bird Observatory
 Observatoire d'oiseaux de Tadoussac
 Point Lepreau
 Brier Island Bird Migration Research Station
 Atlantic Bird Observatory
 Gros Morne National Migration Monitoring Station
 Bruce Peninsula Bird Observatory
 St. Andrews Banding Station
 McGill Bird Observatory / Observatoire d'Oiseaux de McGill

Colombia
 Chocó Bird Observatory

Costa Rica
 Costa Rica Bird Observatories

Czech Republic
Červenohorské sedlo in Hrubý Jeseník

Estonia
 Kabli Bird Observatory
 Vaibla Bird Observatory

France
 Ligue pour la Protection des Oiseaux

Germany
 Randecker Maar Observatory for Bird and Insect Migration, Swabian Jura, Baden-Württemberg
 Heligoland Bird Observatory
 Rossitten Bird Observatory (the world's first, now in Russia's Kaliningrad Oblast)

Greece
 Antikythira Bird Observatory

Hungary
 Ócsa Bird Ringing Station

Israel
 Jerusalem Bird Observatory

Jordan
 Aqaba Bird Observatory

México
 Yucatán Bird Observatory

Nepal
 Kosi Bird Observatory

Peru
 Manu Bird Observatory

Sweden
 Falsterbo Bird Observatory
 Ottenby Bird Observatory

Switzerland
 Swiss Ornithological Institute

United States
Alaska Bird Observatory, Alaska
Biocore Prairie Bird Observatory, Wisconsin
Black Swamp Bird Observatory, Ohio
Braddock Bay Bird Observatory, New York
Cape Fear Bird Observatory, North Carolina
Cape May Bird Observatory, New Jersey
Cape Romain Bird Observatory, South Carolina
Chipper Woods Bird Observatory, Indiana
Coastal Virginia Wildlife Observatory, Virginia
Derby Hill Bird Observatory, New York
Golden Gate Raptor Observatory, California
Great Basin Bird Observatory, Nevada
Gulf Coast Bird Observatory, Texas
Hawk Mountain Sanctuary, Pennsylvania
Hawk Ridge Bird Observatory, Minnesota
Hornsby Bend Bird Observatory, Texas
Humboldt Bay Bird Observatory, California
Intermountain Bird Observatory(formerly Idaho Bird Observatory), Idaho
Klamath Bird Observatory, Oregon
Manomet Center for Conservation Sciences, Massachusetts
Missouri River Bird Observatory, Missouri
Norman Bird Sanctuary, Rhode Island
Audubon Society of Rhode Island, Rhode Island
Point Reyes Bird Observatory, California
Powdermill Avian Research Center, Pennsylvania
Rio Grande Valley Bird Observatory, Texas
Rocky Mountain Bird Observatory, Colorado
Rouge River Bird Observatory, Michigan
San Francisco Bay Bird Observatory, California
Sand Bluff Bird Observatory, Illinois
Sandy Hook Bird Observatory, New Jersey
Southeastern Arizona Bird Observatory, Arizona
The Institute for Bird Populations, California
Whitefish Point Bird Observatory, Michigan

References

External links
 Canadian Migration Monitoring Network
 The Bird Observatories Council of Britain and Ireland

Observatory